"Farfalle" is a song recorded by Italian singer Sangiovanni. Produced by Zef and Ítaxa, the song was released as a single on 3 February 2022, and included in his debut album Cadere volare (2022). The song competed in the Sanremo Music Festival 2022, placing fourth in a field of twenty five. Despite not winning, "Farfalle" became a hit in Italy, peaking at number two in the country. The song would later appear in the 2022 dance-rhythm game Just Dance 2023 Edition as an Italian exclusive.

A duet version in Spanish, "Mariposas", featuring Aitana and additional production by Andrés Torres and Mauricio Rengifo, was released on 3 June 2022, and peaked at number ten in Spain.

Background 
Sangiovanni began to tease "Farfalle" on social media in December 2021 and officially announced its release on 13 January. Co-written by himself, he explained upon released that:

Music video 
An accompanying music video directed by LateMilk was released on the singer's YouTube channel on 3 February.

Duet version 
A duet version of "Farfalle" with Spanish singer Aitana translated into the Spanish language was announced on social media on 1 June and released two days later under the title "Mariposas". An accompanying music video directed by Héctor Merce was released on YouTube the same day.

Track listing

Charts

Weekly charts

Year-end charts

Certifications

Release history

References 

2022 songs
2022 singles
Aitana (singer) songs
Sangiovanni songs